The March of Zeitz was a march of the Holy Roman Empire. It was created by Emperor Otto I in the division of the marca Geronis in 965, following the death of Gero the Great. Its capital was Zeitz. Its first and only margrave was Wigger. In 982, Zeitz was reunited with the marches of Meissen and Merseburg under Ricdag, who thus temporarily reunited all of the southern marca Geronis save the Saxon Ostmark. In 983, Zeitz was overrun by the Sorbs and the marcher territory fell into the hands of the Slavs. Nevertheless, the march of Zeitz, along with the later March of Lusatia, was a recurring division of the Meissen march during the reign of the Emperor Henry II.

Sources
Thompson, James Westfall. Feudal Germany, Volume II. New York: Frederick Ungar Publishing Co., 1928. 
Bernhardt, John W. Itinerant Kingship and Royal Monasteries in Early Medieval Germany, c. 936–1075. Cambridge: Cambridge University Press, 1993.

Zeitz
Burgenlandkreis
States and territories established in the 960s
960s establishments in the Holy Roman Empire
965 establishments